The 2021 German Figure Skating Championships were held on December 18–19, 2020 at the Eissportzentrum Westfalen in Dortmund. Skaters competed in the disciplines of men's singles and ladies' singles on the senior level and pair skating on the junior level and ice dance on the senior, junior, and novice levels. Single skating competitions on the junior and novice levels were supposed to be held on March 28–29, 2021 in Dortmund, but were cancelled on March 18, 2021.

The results of the national championships were among the criteria used to choose the German teams for the 2021 World Championships.

Impact of the COVID-19 pandemic 
The Junior and Novice Single skating competition was initially planned for December 11–13, 2020. On November 5, 2020, it was postponed until January 7–10, 2021. After the development of COVID-19 cases after the holidays, it was once again rescheduled for March 28–29, 2021. On March 18, 2021, the comptiiton was officially cancelled.

The Senior competition was originally scheduled to be held in Hamburg and was then moved to Dortmund in December 2020 due to the COVID-19 restrictions in place in Hamburg. The starter field was reduced in size, as skaters training at the national sports base in Oberstdorf were unable to train for extensive periods of time due to the expansive quarantine rules in Bavaria, and thus did not take part in the 2021 German Figure Skating Championships. Additionally, skaters belonging to the Berlin Ice Sport Association were not allowed to attend the competition after health concerns had been raised by the association.

Medalists

Senior results

Men

Ladies

Ice dance

Junior results

Pairs

Ice dance

International team selections

World Championships 
Germany's team for the 2021 World Championships was published on 4 February 2021.

References

External links 

 2021 German Championships at the Deutsche Eislauf Union